

The Civil Aviation Department Mrigasheer (मृगशिरा - "Orion") was a standard-class sailplane developed in India in the 1970s. It was an orthodox design with a high wing, slender, tapering fuselage, and conventional empennage. Construction was wooden throughout. The original HS-1 flew in 1970 and was followed in 1973 by the refined HS-2 design. This differed from its predecessor in having slotted flaps instead of airbrakes, and a completely redesigned tail. The HS-2 prototype placed second in the national gliding championships only a month after its first flight.

Specifications (HS-2)

References

See also

1970s Indian sailplanes
Glider aircraft
Civil Aviation Department aircraft